Oneida Shores Park is a county park in Cicero, New York. It is part of the Onondaga County Parks system.

References 

County parks in New York (state)
Campgrounds in New York (state)
Parks in Onondaga County, New York